Loungue is a town within the Namissiguima department of Yatenga Province in northern Burkina Faso.

External links 
 Loungue at Google Maps

Populated places in the Nord Region (Burkina Faso)